The canton of Manosque-3 (before March 2015: Manosque-Sud-Est) is an administrative division in southeastern France. It consists of the southern part of the commune of Manosque and its southern suburbs. It includes the following communes:
Corbières-en-Provence
Manosque (partly)
Sainte-Tulle

Demographics

See also
Cantons of the Alpes-de-Haute-Provence department

References

Cantons of Alpes-de-Haute-Provence